The number of women sitting in the House of Commons remained at five during the 25th Canadian Parliament; the number of women senators remained at six. 26 women ran for seats in the Canadian House of Commons in the 1962 federal election; four women out of five incumbents were reelected. Margaret Aitken was defeated when she ran for reelection; Isabel Hardie  became the first woman elected to the House of Commons from the Northwest Territories.

Party Standings

Members of the House of Commons

Senators

References 

Lists of women politicians in Canada